The Saskatoon region is the greater metropolitan area of Saskatoon, Saskatchewan. As of 2021 the Statistics Canada estimates the region's population to be 317,480 people.

The area is served by the Saskatoon John G. Diefenbaker International Airport, the 22nd busiest airport in the country.

Unlike many major North American urbanized areas, yet similarly to other prairie centers in Canada, Saskatoon has absorbed numerous neighbouring communities in its history. In the past, when the city limits reached the borders of neighbouring municipalities, such as Sutherland and Nutana, they were simply annexed into Saskatoon's jurisdiction. The vast majority of the region's inhabitants reside within the City of Saskatoon, which now has a population in excess of 270,000.

Geography 
Census metropolitan area (CMA) is the term Statistics Canada uses to determine the demographics of greater Saskatoon (as well as other large Canadian cities).  The Saskatoon CMA includes the City of Saskatoon, Rural Municipality of Corman Park No. 344, the cities of Martensville and Warman, and other smaller communities within the region.

According to Canada's 2021 census, the Saskatoon CMA has surpassed a quarter of a million people and is the 17th largest metropolitan area in the country with an estimated population of 317,480.

List of municipalities

Demographics

Ethnicity 

Note: Totals greater than 100% due to multiple origin responses.

Language 
The question on knowledge of languages allows for multiple responses. The following figures are from the 2021 Canadian Census, and lists languages that were selected by at least 500 respondents.

Notes

References

External links
 Statistics Canada
 The City of Saskatoon
 Saskatoon Regional Economic Development Authority
 R.M. Of Corman Park
 City Of Martensville

Metropolitan areas of Saskatchewan